San Andres, officially the Municipality of San Andres,  (formerly Parpagoja, Salado, and Despujols),  is a 5th class municipality in the province of Romblon, Philippines. According to the 2020 census, it has a population of 15,940 people.

History

Early history

San Andres was originally a barangay of Odiongan which became a municipality on 1920. During the pre-Spanish era, it was a native settlement of nipa huts known as Parpagoja, named after a rare large bird that had its nest among the thicket along the river where settlement was located. Among the first Spaniards to reach Parpagoha during the later half of the 19th century was Don  Jose de Tiran, a military commander of Romblon who set out an inspection trip of the surrounding villages. On reaching the place he ordered a civil guard to fetch a glass of water from nearby well. The water turned out to be salty and the Spaniard yelled "salado!", issuing an official order to that effect. Thus, Parpagoha came to be known as Salado.

In 1882, a prominent resident of Salado named Rufino Leaño was accused of a crime by an influential Spaniard, Don Barcelo. He succeeded in having Leaño imprisoned without trial in the provincial jail of Capiz, to which Romblon then belonged to as a sub-province. Years later, the Spanish Governor-General Eulogio Despujol (1891-1893) visited Capiz, and Leaño successfully sought an audience with him. Governor Despujol found Leaño innocent and set him free. On reaching his hometown, he successfully petitioned the provincial governor to change the name of Salado to Despujols in honor of the Governor-General.

Modern history
On 18 June 1961, during the late years of President Carlos P. Garcia's administration, the fourth change of name for the town came through the enactment of Republic Act No. 3358. The town was renamed San Andres in honor of the town's patron, Saint Andrew, patron of fishermen, since most of the people of San Andres are fisherfolk.

Geography

San Andres is a coastal town on the north-west portion of Tablas Island. It is bounded on the north by the Calatrava, on the south by Odiongan, on the east by San Agustin and on the west by the Tablas Strait. It has mountainous and stony areas.

Climate

Barangays
San Andres is politically subdivided into 13 barangays.

Demographics

According to the 2015 census, San Andres has a population of 15,589 people.  Majority of the population speak Onhan language, while some barangays near Odiongan and Calatrava speak the Asi language. The inhabitants are predominantly Roman Catholic, with a small number of Protestants, Jehovah's Witnesses, and Iglesia ni Cristo.

Economy

Tourism

Some of the tourist attractions and other places of interest in San Andres, include:
San Andres Beach: Located at the town proper of San Andres. Fine gray sands line the three-kilometer stretch of the San Andres shoreline. During the months of June to December, the waters of San Andres beach are ideal for wind surfing.
Mablaran Falls: Located at Barangay Linawan, San Andres, four and a half kilometers from the town proper. Mablaran falls, lies amidst lush greenery and wild foliage. The falls empties into a pool of cool, blue-green waters with a depth of about 20 feet.
Sapatos Point: A big rock with a very peculiar shape like of a shoe or sapatos, which is located at Barangay Mabini.
Cajil Cave: Located at Barangay Pag-alad.
Bangko-Bangko Point: Located at Barangay Agpudlos. It is called Bangko-bangko because of the rare carving of the stones as if chairs.
Bal-ong Falls: An enchanted falls located at Barangay Mari Sur. Cool waters runs through the big rocks at the foot of the falls and flows all the way down to the cool brook.

Government

Pursuant to Chapter II, Title II, Book III of Republic Act 7160 or the Local Government Code of 1991, the municipal government is composed of a mayor (alkalde), a vice mayor (bise alkalde) and members (kagawad) of the legislative branch Sangguniang Bayan alongside a secretary to the said legislature, all of which are elected to a three-year term and are eligible to run for three consecutive terms.

Incumbent mayor and vice mayor of San Andres for the 2022–2025 term are Arsenio "Lolong" Gadon and Joel Ibañez of Nacionalista Party, respectively.

 Died in office. 
 Served in acting capacity. 
 Resigned.

See also
List of renamed cities and municipalities in the Philippines

References

External links

 San Andres, Romblon Profile - Cities and Municipalities Competitive Index
 [ Philippine Standard Geographic Code]
Philippine Census Information

Municipalities of Romblon